John Houston (born 10 March 1983) is a Scottish professional rugby Centre or Wing, currently with Edinburgh Rugby. Houston also plays for Scotland's national rugby sevens team.

Houston won the club's Newcomer of the Year award after his rookie season and went on to help the Scotland A side clinch the IRB Nations Cup in June 2009.

Recording 16 starts in his first campaign as a professional, Houston scored on his home debut against Ulster in September 2008 before repeating the feat on his Heineken Cup debut against Toulouse in November – the effort which won him Edinburgh's Try of the Season award.

He had previously been part of the Hawick side that won the Scottish Premiership Division One, the Scottish Cup and Border League honours in 2001–02.

References

1983 births
Living people
Alumni of Heriot-Watt University
Edinburgh Rugby players
Hawick RFC players
Male rugby sevens players
People educated at Hawick High School
Rugby union players from Hawick
Scotland 'A' international rugby union players
Scotland international rugby sevens players
Scottish rugby union players